Colt 45 is a 2014 French thriller film directed by Fabrice Du Welz and starring Ymanol Perset, Joey Starr and Gerard Lanvin. It is based on an idea by co-writer Fathi Beddiar.

Cast

 Gérard Lanvin as Commandant Christian Chavez
 Joey Starr as Milo Cardena
 Alice Taglioni as Capitaine Isabelle Le Franc
 Ymanol Perset as Vincent Milès
 Simon Abkarian as Commandant Luc Denard
 Antoine Basler as Lieutenant Joseph Fleischmann
 Jo Prestia as Marco
 Salem Kali as Mehdi
  as Michel
 Alexandre Brasseur as Commandant Martial Ricaud
 Philippe Nahon as Préfet Pradier
 Anton Yakovlev as Carmini
 Amr Waked as Baron
 Malek Oudjail as Malek
 Redouane Behache as Tarek Derkaoui
 Aymen Saïdi as Kaïs Derkaoui
 Denis Braccini as Nicolaï
 Michaël Vander-Meiren as Moïse
 Philippe Petit as Pierre - BRI
 Gérard Watkins as Calhoun
 Mick Gould as 75th Ranger Regiment Major
 Richard Sammel as Major
 Mika'ela Fisher as Mika
 Jean-Michel Chapelain as Jean-Michel
 Habibur Rahman as Le directeur de banque

References

External links
 
 

French action thriller films
Films directed by Fabrice Du Welz
Films produced by Thomas Langmann
2010s French films